A Test of Love may refer to:
 Annie's Coming Out, also known as A Test of Love, a 1984 Australian drama film
 A Test of Love (1958 film), a Chinese Yue opera film

See also
 The Test of Love, a 1999 American television drama film